Los Santos District is a district (distrito) of Los Santos Province in Panama. The population according to the 2000 census was 23,828. The district covers a total area of 429 km². The capital lies at the city of La Villa de los Santos.

Administrative divisions
Los Santos District is divided administratively into the following corregimientos:

La Villa de los Santos (capital)
El Guásimo
La Colorada
La Espigadilla
Las Cruces
Las Guabas
Los Angeles
Los Olivos
Llano Largo
Sabanagrande
Santa Ana
Tres Quebradas
Villa Lourdes
Agua Buena
El Ejido

References

Districts of Panama
Los Santos Province